The following list contains many of the people known to have held the office of Master of the Horse in England. Some official records are incomplete, and not all office holders are known.

Masters of the Horse

14th and 15th centuries
 John (de) Brocas, of Clewer. De facto Master of Horse to King Edward III. c.1360–1371
 Bernard Brocas 1371–
 Thomas de Murriex
 Thomas de Clifford, 6th Baron de Clifford 1388–1391
 John Russell 1391–1398
 Richard Redman 1399–1399
 Robert Waterton 1399–1405
 John Waterton 1413–1416
 Henry Noon
 Richard de Beauchamp, 13th Earl of Warwick
 Walter Beauchamp 1429–1430
 John Styward
 John Beauchamp, 1st Baron Beauchamp 1440–
 Thomas de Burgh <1454–?1479
 John Cheyne, Baron Cheyne 1475–1487
 Thomas Tyrrell 1483–1483
 James Tyrrell 1483–

16th century
 Thomas Brandon c.1485–1510
 Thomas Knyvett 1510–1512
 Charles Brandon, 1st Duke of Suffolk 1513–1515
 Henry Guilford 1515–1522
 Nicholas Carew (Tudor statesman) 1522–1539
 Anthony Browne 1539–1548
 William Herbert, 1st Earl of Pembroke 1548–1552
 John Dudley, 2nd Earl of Warwick 1552–1553
 Edward Hastings 1553–1556
 Henry Jerningham 1556–1558
 Lord Robert Dudley 1558–1587, created Earl of Leicester in 1564
 Robert Devereux, 2nd Earl of Essex 1587–1601

17th century
 Edward Somerset, 4th Earl of Worcester (c. 1601–1616)
 George Villiers, 1st Duke of Buckingham (1616–1628), created Duke of Buckingham in 1623
 Henry Rich, 1st Earl of Holland (1628)
 James Hamilton, Marquess of Hamilton (1628–c. 1644), created Duke of Hamilton in 1643
 Prince Rupert of the Rhine (1653–1655), in exile
 John Claypole (1653–?1660), appointed by Oliver Cromwell during the Commonwealth
 George Monck, 1st Duke of Albemarle (1660–1668)
 George Villiers, 2nd Duke of Buckingham (1668–1674)
 James Scott, 1st Duke of Monmouth (1674–1679)
In commission (1679–1681):
 Stephen Fox
 Richard Mason
 Nicholas Armorer
 Thomas Wyndham
Roger Pope
 Charles Lennox, 1st Duke of Richmond (1681–1685)
Commissioners appointed during the Duke of Richmond's minority (1682–1685):
 Henry Guy
 Theophilus Oglethorpe
 Charles Adderley
 George Legge, 1st Baron Dartmouth (1685–1689)
 Henry Overkirke (1689–1702)

18th century
In commission (1702):
 Stephen Fox
 Benjamin Bathurst
 Hugh Chudleigh
 Charles Seymour, 6th Duke of Somerset (1702–1712)
In commission (1712–1714):
 Conyers Darcy
George Feilding
 Charles Seymour, 6th Duke of Somerset (1714–1715)
In commission (1715–1717):
 Conyers Darcy
 Francis Negus
In commission (1717–1727):
 Francis Negus
 Richard Lumley, 2nd Earl of Scarbrough (1727–1735)
 Charles Lennox, 2nd Duke of Richmond (1735–1750)
vacant
 Marquess of Hartington (1751–1755)
 Lionel Sackville, 1st Duke of Dorset (1755–1757)
 Granville Leveson-Gower, Earl Gower (1757–1760)
 Francis Hastings, 10th Earl of Huntingdon (1760–1761)
 John Manners, 3rd Duke of Rutland (1761–1766)
 Francis Seymour-Conway, Earl of Hertford (1766)
 Peregrine Bertie, 3rd Duke of Ancaster and Kesteven (1766–1778)
 Hugh Percy, 1st Duke of Northumberland (1778–1780)
 George Montagu, 1st Duke of Montagu (1780–1790)
 James Graham, 3rd Duke of Montrose (1790–1795)
 John Fane, 10th Earl of Westmorland (1795–1798)
 Philip Stanhope, 5th Earl of Chesterfield (1798–1804)

19th century
 Francis Seymour-Conway, 2nd Marquess of Hertford (1804–1806)
 Henry Herbert, 1st Earl of Carnarvon (1806–1807)
 James Graham, 3rd Duke of Montrose (1807–1821)
 Charles Sackville-Germain, 5th Duke of Dorset (1821–1827)
 George Osborne, 6th Duke of Leeds (1827–1830)
 William Keppel, 4th Earl of Albemarle (1830–1834)
 Charles Sackville-Germain, 5th Duke of Dorset (1835)
 William Keppel, 4th Earl of Albemarle (1835–1841)
 George Child-Villiers, 5th Earl of Jersey (1841–1846)
 Henry Fitzalan-Howard, 13th Duke of Norfolk (1846–1852)
 George Child-Villiers, 5th Earl of Jersey (1852)
 Arthur Wellesley, 2nd Duke of Wellington (1853–1858)
 Henry Somerset, 8th Duke of Beaufort (1858–1859)
 George Brudenell-Bruce, 2nd Marquess of Ailesbury (1859–1866)
 Henry Somerset, 8th Duke of Beaufort (1866–1868)
 George Brudenell-Bruce, 2nd Marquess of Ailesbury (1868–1874)
 Orlando Bridgeman, 3rd Earl of Bradford (1874–1880)
 Hugh Grosvenor, 1st Duke of Westminster (1880–1885)
 Orlando Bridgeman, 3rd Earl of Bradford (1885–1886)
 Richard Boyle, 9th Earl of Cork (1886)
 William Cavendish-Bentinck, 6th Duke of Portland (1886–1892)
 William Monson, 1st Viscount Oxenbridge (1892–1894)
 Richard Boyle, 9th Earl of Cork (1894–1895)
 William Cavendish-Bentinck, 6th Duke of Portland (1895–1905)

20th century

 Osbert Molyneux, 6th Earl of Sefton (1905–1907)
 Bernard Forbes, 8th Earl of Granard (1907–1915)
 Edwyn Scudamore-Stanhope, 10th Earl of Chesterfield (1915–1922)
 Thomas Thynne, 5th Marquess of Bath (1922–1924)
 Bernard Forbes, 8th Earl of Granard (1924–1936)
 Henry Somerset, 10th Duke of Beaufort (1936–1978)
 David Fane, 15th Earl of Westmorland (1978–1991)
 Savile Crossley, 3rd Baron Somerleyton (1991–1999)
 Samuel Vestey, 3rd Baron Vestey (1999–2018)

21st century
 Rupert Ponsonby, 7th Baron de Mauley (2019–present)

References

Bibliography
 
 
 The Seaxe Newsletter of the Middlesex Heraldry Society, Feb 2007

 
Masters of the Horse